An Se-young (born 5 February 2002) is a South Korean badminton player from Gwangju, who was awarded as 2019 Most Promising Player of the Year by the BWF. 

In 2018, An was selected to join the national team and became the first junior high school student in the Korean national team. She was part of the national junior team that clinched the mixed team title at the 2017 Asian Junior Championships. An later represented her country at the 2018 Uber Cup in Bangkok, and Asian Games in Jakarta, helped the team win an Uber Cup bronze. In 2019, she clinched the BWF World Tour title at the Super 300 New Zealand Open, beating the 2012 Olympic gold medalist Li Xuerui of China in the final.

Achievements

BWF World Championships 
Women's singles
{| class="sortable wikitable" style="font-size: 90%;"
! Year
! Venue
! Opponent
! Score
! Result
|- style="background:#F3E6D7"
| align="center" | 2022
| align="left" | Tokyo Metropolitan Gymnasium, Tokyo, Japan
| align="left" |  Akane Yamaguchi
| align="left" | 19–21, 12-21
| style="text-align:left; background:white" |  Bronze
'|}

 Asian Championships Women's singles BWF World Tour (14 titles, 7 runners-up) 
The BWF World Tour, which was announced on 19 March 2017 and implemented in 2018, is a series of elite badminton tournaments sanctioned by the Badminton World Federation (BWF). The BWF World Tour is divided into levels of World Tour Finals, Super 1000, Super 750, Super 500, Super 300, and the BWF Tour Super 100.Women's singles BWF International Challenge/Series (1 title, 2 runners-up) Women's singles''

  BWF International Challenge tournament
  BWF International Series tournament
  BWF Future Series tournament

Record against selected opponents 
Record against year-end Finals finalists, World Championships semi-finalists, and Olympic quarter-finalists. Accurate as of 2023 India Open.

References

External links 

 

2002 births
Living people
Sportspeople from Gwangju
South Korean female badminton players
Badminton players at the 2020 Summer Olympics
Olympic badminton players of South Korea
Badminton players at the 2018 Asian Games
Asian Games competitors for South Korea
21st-century South Korean women